Clivia is a genus of flowering plants.

Clivia may also refer to:

Clivia (apple), a German apple cultivar
Clivia (opera), German-language operetta by Nico Dostal
 Clivia (film), a 1954 West German musical film